Kurapaty is a wooded area on the outskirts of Minsk, Belarus, in which a vast number of people were executed between 1937 and 1941 during the Great Purge by the Soviet secret police, the NKVD.

The exact count of victims is uncertain, as NKVD archives are classified in Belarus. According to various sources the number of people who perished in Kurapaty is estimated to be at least 30,000 (according to the Attorney General of BSSR Tarnaŭski), up to 100,000 people (according to “Belarus” reference book), from 102,000 to 250,000 people (according to the article by Zianon Pazniak in the “Litaratura i Mastactva” newspaper), 250,000 people (according to Polish historian and professor of University of Wrocław ), and more (according to the British historian Norman Davies). Most of the victims were the Belarusian intelligentsia.

In 2004, Kurapaty mass graves were included in the register of the Cultural Properties of Belarus as a first-category cultural heritage.

Discovery and remembrance

The discovery by historian Zianon Paźniak and exhumation of the remains in 1988 gave an added momentum to the pro-democracy and pro-independence movement in Belarus in the last years of the Soviet Union before it dissolved. There have been investigations by both the Soviet, and Belarusian governments, which have been conclusive as to the perpetrators were Soviet NKVD. This is based on former NKVD members' confessions and the eyewitness testimonies of 55 villagers, from villages such as Cna, Cna-Yodkava, Drazdova, Padbaloccie and others, who gave evidence that NKVD brought people in trucks and executed them during 1937–1941.

President of the United States Bill Clinton visited Kurapaty forest in 1994, when he came to Belarus with a "thank you" visit after Belarus agreed to transfer their post-Soviet nuclear weapons to Russia. Clinton gifted a small granite monument "To Belarusians from the American people", perhaps the first post-Soviet cultural artifact from the U.S. on the Belarusian soil. The monument was damaged three times by unidentified vandals, but subsequently restored.

In 2001, when the Kurapaty site was threatened by a planned widening of the Minsk Ring Road, youth from the Belarusian Popular Front, Zubr, and smaller organizations occupied the site and sat out a bitter winter in tents, trying to halt the road construction, however with no success.

On October 29, 2004, the Jewish community of Belarus installed a monument in memory of the Jews and other nationals who were murdered in Kurapaty forest. The brown granite stone has two inscriptions, in Yiddish and in Belarusian: "To our fellow-believers—Jews, Christians and the Muslims—the victims of Stalinism from the Belarusian Jews."

Each year in November, on Dziady (the All Saints or the day when Belarusians commemorate their deceased forefathers), hundreds of people visit this site of crimes of Soviet political repression.

Gallery

See also
 Bykivnia
 Dem'ianiv Laz
 Great Purge
 Katyn massacre
 NKVD massacres of prisoners
 Vinnytsia massacre

References

Bibliography
 Kuropaty: The Investigation of a Stalinist Historical Controversy by David R. Marples - Slavic Review Vol. 53, No. 2 (Summer, 1994), pp. 513–523
 'Kurapaty The Road of Death'

External links
 Kurapaty – The Road of Death
 
  Belarus Digest
 Kurapaty (1937–1941): NKVD Mass Killings in Soviet Belarus

1937 in the Soviet Union
1939 in the Soviet Union
1941 in the Soviet Union
Mass murder in 1937
Mass murder in 1939
Mass murder in 1941
Forests of Belarus
Mass graves
Massacres in Belarus
Massacres in the Soviet Union
Geography of Minsk
Parks in Minsk
History of Minsk
NKVD
Political repression in the Soviet Union
Massacres committed by the Soviet Union
Politics of Belarus
Communist repression
Execution sites